Archie J. Cassidy was an Irish Labour Party politician. He was elected to Dáil Éireann as a Labour Party Teachta Dála (TD) for the Donegal constituency at the September 1927 general election. He lost his seat at the 1932 general election.

References

Year of birth missing
Year of death missing
Labour Party (Ireland) TDs
Members of the 6th Dáil
Politicians from County Donegal